Douglas Wolk  (born 1970) is a Portland, Oregon-based author and critic. He has written about comics and popular music for publications including The New York Times, Rolling Stone, The Washington Post, The Nation, The New Republic, Salon.com, Pitchfork Media, Vanity Fair, and The Believer. Wolk was the managing editor of CMJ New Music Monthly from 1993 to 1997, and hosted a radio show on WFMU from 1999 to 2001. He has four published books. The most recent, All of the Marvels, tours the Marvel comics universe via his project of reading all 27,000 Marvel superhero comics. In support of that project, in January 2019 he launched a members-only reading group, wherein participants collectively read and discuss a single issue of a Marvel comic book every day. He frequently appears discussing comics on the YouTube channel of Portland comic book store, Books with Pictures.

Biography

Early life 
Wolk grew up in East Lansing, Michigan.

Marriage and children 
He married Lisa Gidley in 2001. They have one child.

Published works 

James Brown's Live at the Apollo (a volume in the  33⅓ series) (2004, Continuum Books) 
 Reading Comics: How Graphic Novels Work and What They Mean (2007, Da Capo Press)
Judge Dredd: Mega City Two: City of Courts, with Ulises Fariñas. (2014, IDW)
 All of the Marvels: A Journey to the Ends of the Biggest Story Ever Told (2021)

Honors, decorations, awards and distinctions 

 2002-2003 Mid-Career Fellow, National Arts Journalism Program at Columbia University
 2008 Eisner Award, Best Comics-Related Book
 2008 Harvey Award for Best Biographical, Historical, or Journalistic Presentation
 2010-2011 Fellow with the USC Annenberg/Getty Arts Journalism Program

References

External links 
Douglas Wolk, Douglas Wolk's website
Patreon, Douglas Wolk's Comics Reading Club and Discussion Board
Twitter Douglas Wolk's Twitter
Tumblr: All of the Marvels
Instagram: All of the Marvels
HILOBROW Thoughts and Oddities by Douglas Wolk at HILOBROW
Lacunae, Douglas Wolk's blog
circletheglo.be, Douglas Wolk's tumblr
Dark Beloved Cloud Records

Articles with hCards
Living people
American music journalists
American music critics
Writers from Portland, Oregon
American bloggers
The New Republic people
American radio DJs
21st-century American non-fiction writers
Comics critics
1970 births